Sarah Chepchirchir (born 27 July 1984 in Nandi County) is a Kenyan long-distance runner who competes in road running competitions in distances ranging from 10K runs to the half marathon.

She started her professional career by running in races in France. In 2008, she had top three finishes in the Saint-Pol, Auray-Vannes and Le Lion Half Marathons. She made her impact on the scene in 2009, winning the Maroilles 20K and Auray-Vannes Half Marathon. A runner-up finish at the Course Paris-Versailles, a third place at the 20 Kilomètres de Paris, then a personal best of 71:54 minutes at the Reims à Toutes Jambes half marathon cemented her place among the country's top road runners.

In the 2010 season she was in the top three at the Corrida de Langueux, Maroilles 20K and Lille Half Marathon – at the latter she ran a personal best time of 69:27 minutes. This helped her earn her first international selection: at the 2010 IAAF World Half Marathon Championships she placed eleventh. She topped the podium at the Auray-Vannes and Boulogne-Billancourt Half Marathons that year.

Chepchirchir was in the top two of all her French road races in 2011, including victories at the Le Puy-en-Velay 15K and the Humarathon (where she ran a course record and personal best of 68:07 minutes). In her second international outing for Kenya she placed fifth at the 2011 All-Africa Games half marathon. In 2012, she ran two sub-70-minute half marathons but this was only enough for third in Paris and fifth in Lille. She claimed the course record at the 2013 Paris 20K with a run of 1:05:03 hours, and also won the Ndakaini Marathon in Kenya.

Personal bests
10K run – 31:25 minutes (2012)
20 kilometres – 1:05:01 hours (2013)
Half marathon – 1:08:07 hours (2011)
Marathon – 2:19:47 hours (2017)

References

External links

Living people
1984 births
People from Nandi County
Kenyan female long-distance runners
Athletes (track and field) at the 2011 All-Africa Games
African Games competitors for Kenya